is a Japanese actress. She played the lead female role in NHK's 2004 TV Asadora drama Wakaba.

Filmography

Films

Television movies

Drama series

References

Japanese actresses
1984 births
Living people
Asadora lead actors